Frail may refer to:

 , a Finnish rock band
 Frail (Maria Solheim album), a 2004 album by Norwegian artist Maria Solheim
 Frail (Jars of Clay album), a 1994 demo album by Christian rock band Jars of Clay
 "Frail" (Jars of Clay song), 1987
 "Frail" (Crystal Castles song), 2015

People with the surname
 Dale Frail, Canadian astronomer
 Joe Frail (1869–1939), English footballer
 John Frail (died 1915), Scottish footballer
 Stephen Frail (born 1969), Scottish football manager

See also
 Clawhammer, a banjo playing style
 Frailty (disambiguation)
 Fraile (disambiguation)
 Frailes (disambiguation)